Flanimals of the Deep is the third book in the Flanimals series from British comedian Ricky Gervais and illustrator Rob Steen. The book was published by Faber and Faber, London, UK on 5 October 2006 and includes such Flanimals as the Mulgi, Flambols, Bif Uddlers and Mulons.

Flanimals of the Deep won the 'Best Stocking Filler' book of the year in 2006, as voted on Richard and Judy's Christmas Book Reviews. It was also named the "WH Smith Children's Book of the Year" for 2007.

List of Flanimals 
 Mulon – a humanoid extremely intelligent Flanimal.
 Groy – a small farming aquatic Flanimal.
 Sleeb – a slow moving bovine-like Flanimal farmed by the Groy.
 Molf – an aggressive shark-like aquatic Flanimal.
 Sproy – a many 'noizelled' Flanimal.
 Plumph – a Flanimal that can pull its eyes into its body for protection but damages its own eyes on its own poison.
 Hungloid – a large fish-like Flanimal.
 Klug Snipe – a hideous aquatic Flanimal.
 Roxstrambler – a crab-like predatory Flanimal.
 Spryflajer – an aquatic Flanimal with tennis racket shaped fins.
 Splug – a jellyfish-like Flanimal that hates itself.
 Blamp – an old fish-like Flanimal.
 Ungler Water Mungler – an aquatic version of the Mung Ungler (described in More Flanimals).
 Flambol – a flat paper thin Flanimal.

Additional Flanimals 

 Grob – a mythical heavenly Flanimal.
 Lazabranks – a family of primitive shark-like unskulled Flanimals.
 Snish – simple fish-like Flanimals.
 Scrownocks – aquatic Flanimals that produce a spine-tingling scream.
 Brones – thin jawed aquatic Flanimals.
 Skrolls – terrifying demon-like aquatic Flanimals that inhabit the brine.

See also

Flanimals
More Flanimals
Flanimals: The Day of the Bletchling

References

External links 
 Official website
 Flanimals on Rob Steen's site
 Faber and Faber - UK publisher of all the Flanimals books

2006 children's books
British children's books
British picture books
Children's fiction books
Books by Ricky Gervais
Faber and Faber books